Phyllis Byam Shand Allfrey (24 October 1908 – 4 February 1986) was a West Indian writer, socialist activist, newspaper editor and politician of the island of Dominica in the Caribbean. She is best known for her first novel, The Orchid House (1953), based on her own early life, which in 1991 was turned into a Channel 4 television miniseries of the same name in the United Kingdom.

Early life and family background

Born in Roseau, Dominica, West Indies, in 1908, she was the daughter of Francis Byam Berkeley Shand and Elfreda (daughter of Henry Alfred Alford Nicholls), and was baptized Phyllis Byam. Her father's settler family was long established in Roseau. With roots in the West Indies going back to the 17th century, Phyllis later described herself as "a West Indian of over 300 years' standing, despite my pale face."

Her earliest ancestor in the West Indies was Lieutenant General William Byam, a Royalist officer who in 1644 defended Bridgwater in Somerset against a parliamentary force. Imprisoned in the Tower of London, he was permitted to migrate to the West Indies. After the Restoration of King Charles II in 1660, he was granted estates in Antigua.

Life and career
Phyllis Shand married Robert Allfrey, an English Oxford engineer, and they had five children, including their adopted sons, Robbie and David, from a Carib reservation. Their daughter Phina, another Oxford University graduate, was killed in a motor accident in Botswana.

In politics, Allfrey founded the Dominica Labour Party. On the formation of the West Indies Federation, this was affiliated to the West Indies Federal Labour Party, and in 1958 she was elected to the new Federal Parliament of the West Indies Federation, representing Dominica. Within weeks she was serving in the government of Sir Grantley Adams as Minister of Labour and Social Affairs and was the only woman minister of the new Federation. In 1941 Allfrey established a connection with Tribune, the newspaper of the left wing of the British Labour Party, where from 1941 to 1944 her reviews, poems and short stories appeared regularly alongside those of regular contributors such as Naomi Mitchison, Stevie Smith, Julian Symons, Elizabeth Taylor, Inez Holden and George Orwell, the latter becoming its literary editor in 1943. Phyllis Shand earned second place in an international poetry competition judged by Vita Sackville-West.

She edited the Dominica Herald and also published and wrote for another newspaper, The Dominica Star, which was in being between 1965 and 1982.

Death
Allfrey died in Dominica in 1986, aged 77. A posthumous collection of her short stories, It Falls Into Place, was published by Papillote Press in 2004. She left behind an unpublished novel, In the Cabinet. A collection of her poems, Love for an Island: the Collected Poems of Phyllis Shand Allfrey, was published in 2014 (Papillote Press).

Publications
In Circles (poems, 1940)
Palm and Oak (poems, 1950)
The Orchid House (1953, Constable); new edition Virago, 1982,  
 It Falls into Place (2004), Papillote Press,  
 Love for an Island: The Collected Poems of Phyllis Shand Allfrey (2014; edited by Lizabeth Paravisini-Gebert), Papillote Press,

See also
Jean Rhys

Notes

External links
"O Stay and Hear" (short story by Allfrey published in the August 2004 Caribbean Review of Books
The Dominica Star is freely and fully available in the Digital Library of the Caribbean

1908 births
1986 deaths
People from Roseau
Dominica people of British descent
Dominica Labour Party politicians
Dominica writers
Dominica women writers
Dominica women in politics
Women novelists
Deaths in Dominica
20th-century women writers
20th-century novelists
Members of the Federal Parliament of the West Indies Federation